Charles Baker (1809 – August 3, 1891), also known as Henry Baker, was a Union Navy sailor in the American Civil War and a recipient of the U.S. military's highest decoration, the Medal of Honor, for his actions at the Battle of Mobile Bay.

Biography

Born in 1809 in the Georgetown area of Washington, D.C., Baker was living in New York City when he joined the Navy. Despite intense fire, the boat crew was able to pull ten Tecumseh men from the water. For this action, Baker was awarded the Medal of Honor a year and a half later, on January 15, 1866. Baker's first name is given in some records as "Henry", and his medal is inscribed with that name. Five other members of the boat crew also received the Medal of Honor: Seaman James Avery, Ordinary Seaman John C. Donnelly, Captain of the Forecastle John Harris, Seaman Henry Johnson, and Landsman Daniel Noble.

Baker's official Medal of Honor citation reads:
Served on board the U.S.S. Metacomet. As a member of the boat's crew which went to the rescue of the U.S. monitor Tecumseh when that vessel was struck by a torpedo in passing the enemy forts in Mobile Bay, 5 August 1864, Q.G. Baker braved the enemy fire which was said by the admiral [ David Farragut ] to be "one of the most galling" he had ever seen, and aided in rescuing from death 10 of the crew of the Tecumseh, eliciting the admiration of both friend and foe.

Baker died on August 3, 1891, at age 80 or 81 and was buried at Mount Moriah Cemetery in lot 296 of the Naval Plot.

See also

List of American Civil War Medal of Honor recipients: A-F

References

1809 births
1891 deaths
American Civil War recipients of the Medal of Honor
Burials at Mount Moriah Cemetery (Philadelphia)
Military personnel from Washington, D.C.
People of Washington, D.C., in the American Civil War
Union Navy sailors
United States Navy Medal of Honor recipients